Yuma High School may refer to:
Yuma High School (Arizona), Yuma, Arizona
Yuma High School (Colorado), Yuma, Colorado